Henry Joseph Kirk (born 25 August 1944) is a Scottish former footballer who played on the left wing. He played in the Football League in England for Middlesbrough, Darlington, Hartlepool, Scunthorpe United and Stockport County, in the Scottish Football League for Third Lanark, Falkirk and Dumbarton, and in the Swedish Division 2 Norra for IK Sirius.

References

1944 births
Living people
People from Saltcoats
English footballers
Association football wingers
Middlesbrough F.C. players
Third Lanark A.C. players
Falkirk F.C. players
Dumbarton F.C. players
Darlington F.C. players
Hartlepool United F.C. players
Scunthorpe United F.C. players
Stockport County F.C. players
IK Sirius Fotboll players
English Football League players
Scottish Football League players